was a  of the Imperial Japanese Navy.

Design and description
The Yūgumo class was a repeat of the preceding  with minor improvements that increased their anti-aircraft capabilities. Their crew numbered 228 officers and enlisted men. The ships had two Kampon geared steam turbines, each driving one propeller shaft, using steam provided by three Kampon water-tube boilers.

The main armament of the Yūgumo class consisted of six Type 3  guns in three twin-gun turrets, one superfiring pair aft and one turret forward of the superstructure. The guns were able to elevate up to 75° to increase their ability against aircraft, but their slow rate of fire, slow traversing speed, and the lack of any sort of high-angle fire-control system meant that they were virtually useless as anti-aircraft guns. They were built with four Type 96  anti-aircraft guns in two twin-gun mounts, but more of these guns were added over the course of the war. The ships were also armed with eight  torpedo tubes in a two quadruple traversing mounts; one reload was carried for each tube. Their anti-submarine weapons comprised two depth charge throwers for which 36 depth charges were carried.

Construction and career
From 15–20 October 1943, Hayanami was used on troop transport runs from Saeki to Truk. The destroyer was used on troop transport runs from Truk to Ponape on 22-24 and 26–28 October. She provided escort for a troop transport run on 6 November to Bougainville.

The ship blew up and sank with 208 killed; 45 survivors were rescued by the destroyer .

On 10 August 1944, Hayanami was removed from the Navy List.

Notes

References

External links
 CombinedFleet.com: Yūgumo-class destroyers
 CombinedFleet.com: Hayanami history

Yūgumo-class destroyers
World War II destroyers of Japan
Ships sunk by American submarines
Shipwrecks in the Sulawesi Sea
1942 ships
Maritime incidents in June 1944
Ships built by Maizuru Naval Arsenal